Crassispira jamaicense is an extinct species of sea snail, a marine gastropod mollusk in the family Pseudomelatomidae, the turrids and allies. Fossils have been found in  Jamaica.

References

 Guppy, RJ Lechmere. "On the Tertiary Mollusca of Jamaica." Quarterly Journal of the Geological Society 22.1-2 (1866): 281–295.
 W. P. Woodring. 1928. Miocene Molluscs from Bowden, Jamaica. Part 2: Gastropods and discussion of results. Contributions to the Geology and Palaeontology of the West Indies. Contributions to the Geology and Palaeontology of the West Indies
 W. P. Woodring. 1970. Geology and paleontology of canal zone and adjoining parts of Panama: Description of Tertiary mollusks (gastropods: Eulimidae, Marginellidae to Helminthoglyptidae). United States Geological Survey Professional Paper 306(D):299-452

jamaicense
Gastropods described in 1866